Jeffrey Lynn Newman (born September 11, 1948) is an American former Major League Baseball catcher. Newman was drafted by the Cleveland Indians in the 26th round of the 1970 Major League Baseball Draft. He made his MLB debut in 1976. He was an All Star in 1979.

Early and personal life
Newman was born in Forth Worth, Texas, and is Jewish. He attended Paschal High School, where he played baseball and basketball. He later lived in Danville, California.

Newman is a convert to Judaism, having in 1970 converted in an Orthodox ceremony. His son, Ryan, was an infielder for three years in the Pittsburgh Pirates' organization before becoming a coach for the 2005 Gulf Coast League Pirates.

College

In his sophomore year after batting .350 he was All-Southwest Conference First Team and All NCAA All-District First Team as well as NCAA All American Third Team, and in 1969 as a junior he batted .345, set university records in RBIs (44) and hits (57), and was All-Conference and All-District First Team.

Minor leagues
Newman was drafted by the Cleveland Indians in the 26th round of the 1970 Major League Baseball Draft. Originally, Newman played first, third and the outfield. He played for the GCL Indians of the Gulf Coast League in 1970 (batting .313, leading the league in RBIs with 55, and tying for the league lead in home runs with six, while playing primarily first base), for the Reno Silver Sox of the California League in 1971 (hitting 16 home runs in 234 at bats, while playing primarily outfield) and 1972 (hitting 20 home runs and 84 RBIs), and for the San Antonio Brewers of the Texas League in 1972. In 1974 he played for the Oklahoma City 89ers of the American Association and the Salt Lake City Angels of the Pacific Coast League (batting .303), in 1975 he played for Salt Lake City and for the Toledo Mud Hens of the International League, and in 1975 he again played for Toledo.

He didn't begin catching until  with the Reno Silver Sox. He spent six seasons in the Indians' farm system, batting .259 with 73 home runs and 333 runs batted in when the Oakland A's purchased his contract in October .

Major leagues

Oakland Athletics
Newman was called up to the majors in June , when he was 27 years old, and spent the rest of the season backing up Gene Tenace behind the plate. He then moved into a platoon with Jim Essian from  through , while also backing up Dave Revering at first base.

He was batting .229 with 16 home runs and 52 RBIs when he was selected by AL manager Bob Lemon as Oakland's sole representative at the 1979 Major League Baseball All-Star Game. For the season, he hit 22 home runs and drove in 71 runs, both career highs. He also threw out 46.8% of attempted base-stealers, fourth-best of all catchers in the American League.

Newman was involved in the first of two bench-clearing brawls with Lenny Randle and the Seattle Mariners on April 19, . The A's won the first half of the strike shortened season with a 37–23 record to return to the postseason for the first time since . In 1981 he also threw out 46.4% of attempted base-stealers, fifth-best of all catchers in the American League. In his only career trip to the postseason, Newman went hitless in nine plate appearances in the American League West division series and ALCS.

At the start of the December  Winter Meetings, the A's sent Newman and outfielder Tony Armas to the Boston Red Sox for Carney Lansford, Garry Hancock, and minor leaguer Jerry King.

Boston Red Sox
When the Red Sox originally acquired Newman in 1982, it was with the intent that he would be the back-up to Rich Gedman behind the plate. However, he soon fell to third in the depth chart behind Gary Allenson. He was released during spring training in April .

Career stats

Newman had perhaps his greatest hitting success against Wayne Garland, against whom he was 13–18 (.722) with two home runs, six doubles and a walk. He made his only appearance on the mound on September 14, 1977. He pitched one scoreless inning, though he hit the first batter he faced (Hal McRae) with a pitch.

Coaching and managerial career
As soon as his playing days ended, Newman returned to the Oakland A's as manager Jackie Moore's bullpen coach. When Moore was fired as A's manager on June 28, Newman was named interim manager prior to the hiring of Tony La Russa. The A's went 2–8 under Newman. Through 2018, he was one of eight Jewish managers in MLB history. The others were Gabe Kapler, Bob Melvin, Brad Ausmus, Norm Sherry, Harold “Lefty” Phillips, Lou Boudreau, and Lipman Pike. He remained a coach and manager with the A's at the minor league level through , being named the Southern League's Manager of the Year in  while managing the Huntsville Stars to a win–loss percentage of .573.

An August 2005 Achilles injury requiring surgery prematurely ended his coaching career in Seattle.

See also

List of Jewish baseball players

References

External links

Jeff Newman at Baseball Almanac
Jeff Newman at Pura Pelota (Venezuelan Professional Baseball League)

1948 births
Living people
American League All-Stars
Baltimore Orioles coaches
Baseball players from Texas
Boston Red Sox players
Cleveland Indians coaches
Converts to Judaism
Gulf Coast Indians players
Jewish American baseball managers
Jewish American baseball players
Jewish Major League Baseball players
Major League Baseball bench coaches
Major League Baseball catchers
Oakland Athletics coaches
Oakland Athletics managers
Oakland Athletics players
Oklahoma City 89ers players
Reno Silver Sox players
Salt Lake City Angels players
Salt Lake City Gulls players
San Antonio Brewers players
Seattle Mariners coaches
Baseball players from Fort Worth, Texas
TCU Horned Frogs baseball players
Texas Christian University alumni
Tigres de Aragua players
American expatriate baseball players in Venezuela
Toledo Mud Hens players
Tucson Toros players
21st-century American Jews